Sardar Mumtaz Khan Tamman (born 26 May 1939) is a Pakistani politician who had been a member of the National Assembly of Pakistan, from 1993 to 1996 and again from October 2010 to May 2018.

Early life

He was born on 26 May 1939.

Political career

He was elected to the National Assembly of Pakistan as a candidate for Pakistan Peoples Party for Constituency NA-44 (Chakwal-II) in 1993 Pakistani general election. He received 77,185 votes and defeated Sardar Mansoor Hayat Tamman of IJI.

He was re-elected to the National Assembly  as a candidate for Pakistan Muslim League (N) (PML-N) for Constituency NA-61 (Chakwal-II) in by-elections held in October 2010. He received 92,714 votes and defeated an independent candidate, Mansoor Hayat Tamman. The seat became vacant after the resignation of Sardar Faiz Tamman who was elected in 2008 Pakistani general election.

He was re-elected to the National Assembly as a candidate for PML-N for Constituency NA-61 (Chakwal-II) in 2013 Pakistani general election. He received 114,282 votes and defeated Chaudhry Pervaiz Elahi.

He was offered PML-Q ticket to contest the 2018 general election from Constituency NA-65 (Chakwal-II) which Tamman declined.

In December 2022, Khan joined the ranks of the Pakistan Tehreek-i-Insaf.

References

Living people
Pakistan Muslim League (N) politicians
Punjabi people
Pakistani MNAs 2013–2018
1939 births
Pakistani MNAs 2008–2013
Pakistani MNAs 1993–1996